Aeolothrips collaris is a species of predatory thrip in the family Aeolothripidae. It is found in Africa, Europe and Northern Asia (excluding China), and North America.

References

Further reading

 
 
 
 

Thrips
Articles created by Qbugbot
Insects described in 1919
Taxa named by Hermann Priesner